In mathematics and statistics, a probability vector or stochastic vector is a vector with non-negative entries that add up to one.

The positions (indices) of a probability vector represent the possible outcomes of a discrete random variable, and the vector gives us the probability mass function of that random variable, which is the standard way of characterizing a discrete probability distribution.

Examples
Here are some examples of probability vectors. The vectors can be either columns or rows.

Geometric interpretation
Writing out the vector components of a vector  as

the vector components must sum to one:

Each individual component must have a probability between zero and one:

for all . Therefore, the set of stochastic vectors coincides with the standard -simplex. It is a point if , a segment if , a (filled) triangle if , a (filled) tetrahedron , etc.

Properties
 The longest probability vector has the value 1 in a single component and 0 in all others, and has a length of 1.
 The shortest vector corresponds to maximum uncertainty, the longest to maximum certainty.

See also
 Stochastic matrix
 Dirichlet distribution

References

Probability theory
Vectors (mathematics and physics)